Benedict Martin (born 17 July 1987) is a Malaysian footballer who plays as a midfielder for his hometown club Sarawak FA after venturing out playing in peninsular Malaysia.

Career
Benedict started his professional career in 2005, enrolling with Sarawak youth squad. He then transferred to Selangor youth squad, due to him furthering his studies in Universiti Teknologi MARA in Shah Alam.

For the 2009 season, Benedict signed to play for Perak. Here, he made his name as a dead-ball specialist for Perak. He played for two seasons with Perak.

He returns to his home state, Sarawak to play for the Sarawak F.A. team in the 2011 Malaysia Premier League season.

After 2 years with Sarawak, Benedict joined Kuala Lumpur in 2013. He also served as team captain during the 2013 season.

References

External links
 Profile at Official Website of Sarawak F.A.
 Benedict Martin profile at Seladang.net
 In Person: Benedict Martin
 

1987 births
Living people
Malaysian footballers
Perak F.C. players
Sarawak FA players
Kuala Lumpur City F.C. players
People from Kuching
People from Sarawak
Association football midfielders